KSAC-FM (105.5 MHz, "Money 105.5") is a business news/talk radio station based in Sacramento, California, United States. The station is licensed to the community of Dunnigan, California and is owned and operated by Salem Media Group.

Station History
The 105.5 signal made its debut in 1982 with the call letters KIQS-FM and was assigned to Willows, California until its move to Dunnigan in 1995 so it can target the Sacramento area. During the move, its owners sold the station to Pacific Spanish Network, who in 1996 changed the call letters to KLNA and broadcast a Spanish Contemporary format until 1998, when it flipped to a Top 40/Dance format as "Power 105." However, this attempt to bring a Dance format to Sacramento was hampered by its signal coverage from the northwestern area, a lack of advertising support and struggling ratings. It also had tough competition from KSFM, KBMB and KDND as well.

On May 4, 2001, Salem bought KLNA and immediately replaced the Dance format with a temporary simulcast of KFIA before putting in place Christian Contemporary as "105.5 The Fish," KKFS. But this attempt also had mixed results in its four years of existence, and in 2005 became KTKZ-FM, a simulcast of AM sister station KTKZ after Salem relocated KKFS to 103.9 FM, where it remains to this day. In 2008 Salem flipped KTKZ-FM to its Spanish Christian "Radio Luz" format and changed the call letters to KXMX, but by 2011 it would drop that format for business News/Talk and become KSAC-FM.

References

External links
KSAC-FM official website

SAC-FM
News and talk radio stations in the United States
Radio stations established in 1982
Salem Media Group properties
1982 establishments in California